The Red River State Fair Classic (formerly the State Fair Classic and, more recently, the Shreveport Classic) was an American college football game played annually in Shreveport, Louisiana, at Independence Stadium—formerly called State Fair Stadium—during the State Fair of Louisiana. It traced its historical lineage from a series of 167 games played over the 106 football seasons between 1911 and 2016. By having first paired historically black colleges and universities in 1915, the contest held the distinction of being the oldest documented annual black college football classic, edging out the Turkey Day Classic by nine years and the similar Texas State Fair Classic by ten years.

Background
The fair began in 1906, and efforts were made immediately to schedule a football game as a draw, specifically a game between Louisiana State University and the Shreveport Athletic Club. Although plans for that game fell through, personnel from the fair persisted and even made a notable, but unsuccessful, attempt to revive the suspended LSU–Tulane rivalry game for the 1910 fair. The fair was finally able to host college football games regularly starting in 1911. Nearby schools Louisiana Tech and Northwestern State played in that first game. The annual Arkansas–LSU game was made its main draw two years later, much like the Red River Showdown game had begun headlining the State Fair of Texas in Dallas in 1912. By 1914, $900 of the fair's $35,039 budget was earmarked specifically for "football." The 1924 Arkansas–LSU game featured a silver football trophy as part of the dedication ceremonies for the new host field, State Fair Stadium. After LSU won for the seventh straight time in 1936, that series was discontinued, and Louisiana Tech and NSU returned to playing in the featured game. When Louisiana Tech began efforts in the late 1980s to move into the NCAA's Division I-A, NSU began playing Louisiana–Monroe in the game.

In the past, as many as four college games were played over the course of a single fair, although the "Louisiana State Fair Classic" moniker was used interchangeably to describe any of the games, not just the featured game. These games tended to include schools from the Ark-La-Tex area. The hometown school, Centenary College, hosted numerous games over the years. Southwestern Athletic Conference schools (usually Southern or Grambling State and Bishop or Wiley colleges) were known to play on Monday, in conjunction with the fair's "Negro Day"—although the 1961 Grambling–Prairie View A&M game was overshadowed by a fan boycott, staged by the Congress of Racial Equality in an effort to encourage improved integration of the fair. When Texas College withdrew from the SWAC several months later and left the Panthers with only two home games, Prairie View decided to invoke SWAC scheduling rules to move the Grambling series back to on-campus venues, ending its Shreveport fair phase. Through the years there was considerable cross-over between SWAC teams that played in Louisiana's State Fair Classic and Texas' own State Fair Classic, and the Grambling–Prairie View series itself is now held at the Texas fair. With the Negro Day game played on Mondays and the featured game and Centenary game usually confined to two of the three weekends that the fair extended through, occasionally another game would be played on the third weekend—college varsity-level or otherwise. College freshman and high school teams were known to compete at the fair in its earlier years, including some pre-Louisiana High School Athletic Association era state championship games. In 1934, 1942, and 1945 military service teams were extended invitations to play; during World War II many colleges—including each of the classic's regular hosts, Centenary, Louisiana Tech, NSU, and Southern—had to discontinue football, while the service teams that appeared in their place helped fill in the gaps on active college teams' schedules and were even included in the Associated Press' college football rankings and bowl games as well.

Discontinuation of the "featured game"
With the Centenary game ceasing after the 1947 campaign (Centenary had disbanded its football program) and Negro Day no longer being observed following the 1961 fair, only the featured game remained as an annual contest at the fair. When the NSU–ULM series returned to on-campus stadiums in 1990, the fair was left without regular tenants and, at times, had to reinvent itself. The Red River Classic—which had long served as an annual, early-season SWAC game for Grambling at Independence Stadium—was moved, in conjunction with the fair, for the 1999 campaign. In 2001 a contest billed as the "Port City Classic–State Fair Game" was hosted by Southern during the fair, but in 2002 the Port City Classic was spun-off separately from the fair and became an early September game instead; the Red River Classic returned to the fair in its place. Louisiana Christian's newly-revived football program also saw a return to the fair that season, as well as in 2003. Prairie View and Grambling, in addition to competing annually at the Texas state fair, have hosted the most recent Louisiana fair games too. Prairie View hosted a series of four annual games dubbed the "Shreveport Classic" starting in 2010, and Grambling began hosting the newly-named "Red River State Fair Classic" during the 2015 season. The City of Shreveport's government actively worked to revive the classic in 2010 and, through 2016, remained a sponsor despite the fact that the classic's new name dropped its reference to the city and added back its reference to the state fair (as well as to the old Red River Classic).

Current status
After initially designating its October 28 contest against Texas Southern as its Red River State Fair Classic game when it released its official 2017 schedule, Grambling instead later announced that it would be moved to Grambling to serve as a homecoming game, allowing GSU to play a fourth home game in Eddie Robinson Stadium, which had just undergone a multi-million dollar renovation. The old "Red River Classic" name was recycled for the game even though it was rescheduled to be played outside of the immediate vicinity of the Red River. No games have been scheduled at the fair since.

In 2022, the old Shreveport Classic was also revived but as a game that would be held in September without any direct associations to the state fair itself.

Notable games
A number of games stand out in the series. The 1915 Arkansas–LSU game saw the largest college football crowd (20,000) in the history of the southwestern U.S. at the time. Also in 1915 the fair broke the color barrier and began hosting African American teams (with the game being its single most lopsided affair as well, a 76–0 Wiley College win over Homer College of Homer, Louisiana). No college games were played at the fair in 1918; the Spanish flu pandemic was ongoing, and World War I would not come to an end until a week after the fair's final scheduled day—generating discussions to curtail or outright cancel the fair. With the 1924 Arkansas–LSU game being played for a silver football trophy (as part of the dedication ceremonies for the new stadium), the series became the first future Southeastern Conference rivalry to feature a trophy. The 1927 Centenary game was moved to Centenary Field to preserve the soggy playing surface for the featured Arkansas–LSU game. In 1936, LSU chose to install Mike I as its first live bengal tiger mascot at the venue, instead of in Baton Rouge. A book by Mark and Jacqueline Scott called Beat TECH! Inside the Louisiana State Fair Football Classics, 1940–42 covers several prominent Louisiana Tech–NSU games before World War II interrupted the series. The 1945 series of games was historic in that it featured a rare look at multiple service teams of the era, shortly before they were phased out with the end of World War II. In 1950, Wiley quarterback A. Bolen threw an 82-yard touchdown pass to end William Gray "(l)ate in the fourth quarter" to force a 14–14 tie and hand Grambling one of its few non-wins in the classic over the decades. In 1968, Bulldog quarterback Terry Bradshaw threw an 82-yard pass to Ken Liberto with 18 seconds remaining to pull out a 42–39 victory over the Demons in what "is generally considered the pinnacle of the State Fair Classic."

Although the annual classic has long provided exhibitions of college football for one the largest markets without any home college team, its local cultural significance may have been eclipsed by the Independence Bowl, judging from the bowl's higher attendance figures. Regardless, in the 56 games between 1956 and 2016, the classic drew 949,109 fans total, for an average of 16,948 per game; this average includes the aforementioned second game of the 1961 fair (which was played under a fan boycott), the second game of 1975 (which drew only 382 people, as a result of massive rainfall), and the 1984 game (which had 6,042 no-shows, also as a result of massive rainfall). The largest documented crowd occurred at the 1980 game (36,000).

Game results 

Note: games were played on "Negro Day" in 1917 and 1919; these games were only vaguely described by the curtailed wartime press as being "Games by visiting collegians," without specifics concerning whether these contests involved varsity teams, all-star teams, or even pick-up games

Appearances by team

Notes: *—record includes 1 win by forfeit; **—record includes 1 loss by forfeit; †—Camp Polk, as a facility that hosted hundreds of thousands of soldiers through the Louisiana Maneuvers, fielded multiple football teams—the 302nd Ordnance Regiment was the team that competed at the 1942 fair; ‡—Randolph Field, as a segregated facility, fielded two football teams: the Caucasian "Ramblers" and the African American "Brown Bombers"—the Brown Bombers were the team that competed at the 1945 fair

See also
List of black college football classics
State Fair Classic (Texas)
Southwestern Athletic Conference (SWAC)
Sports in Shreveport-Bossier

References

American football in Shreveport, Louisiana
Black college football classics
Recurring sporting events established in 1911
1911 establishments in Louisiana